In investment banking, a structurer 

is the finance professional responsible for designing structured products. 
Their solution will typically deliver a bespoke hedge, "yield enhancement", or other feature, as appropriate to the client's needs, and must inhere relevant regulatory and accounting considerations;
see .

The role is usually quantitative, straddling that of sales and trading and front-office quantitative analyst.
The structurer's main analytic task is to determine how the pay rules in question will distribute cash flows for a deal; 
to do so, they will typically build computer models to simulate these subsequent payments, thereby also estimating how collateral payments affect the cash flows. 

The above is preliminary to deal settlement; thereafter it will be in the hands of the Bond administration to apply the rules as described in the deal legal documents.

References

Finance occupations
Financial analysts
Investment banking
Structured finance